Grace Slick (born Grace Barnett Wing; October 30, 1939) is an American painter and former singer-songwriter. Slick was a key figure in San Francisco's early psychedelic music scene in the mid-1960s. With a music career spanning four decades, she first performed with the Great Society, but is best known for her work with Jefferson Airplane and the subsequent successor bands Jefferson Starship and Starship. Slick and Jefferson Airplane first achieved fame with their 1967 album Surrealistic Pillow, which included the top-ten Billboard hits "White Rabbit" and "Somebody to Love". She provided the lead vocals on both tracks. With Starship, she sang co-lead for two number one hits, "We Built This City" and "Nothing's Gonna Stop Us Now". She also released four solo albums. Slick retired from music in 1990, but continues to be active in the visual arts field. Slick was inducted into the Rock and Roll Hall of Fame in 1996 as a member of Jefferson Airplane.

Early life
Grace Barnett Wing was born October 30, 1939, in the Chicago suburb of Highland Park, Illinois, to Ivan Wilford Wing (1907–1987), of British descent, and Virginia Wing (née Barnett; 1909–1983). Her parents met while they were both students at the University of Washington, and later married. In 1949, her brother Chris was born. Her father, working in the investment banking sector for Weeden and Company, was transferred several times when she was a child, and in addition to the Chicago metropolitan area, she lived in Los Angeles and San Francisco, California, before her family finally settled in Palo Alto, California, in the early 1950s.

Wing attended Palo Alto Senior High School, then switched to Castilleja School, a private all-girls school in Palo Alto. Following graduation, she attended Finch College in New York City from 1957 to 1958, and the University of Miami in Coral Gables from 1958 to 1959. On August 26, 1961, Wing married Gerald "Jerry" Slick, an aspiring filmmaker, and after the couple briefly moved away from San Francisco, Grace Slick worked as a model at an I. Magnin department store for three years. Slick also started composing music, including a contribution to a short film by Jerry Slick.

Career

1965–1966: The Great Society

In August 1965, Slick read an article in the San Francisco Chronicle about the newly formed Jefferson Airplane. Despite being situated in the growing musical center of San Francisco, Slick only half-heartedly considered music for a profession until she watched the band live at The Matrix. As a result, Slick (vocals, guitar), accompanied by husband Jerry Slick (drums), Jerry's brother Darby Slick (lead guitar), and David Miner (bass guitar) formed a group called the Great Society. On October 15, 1965, the band made its debut performance at a venue known as the Coffee Gallery, and soon after Slick composed the psychedelic piece "White Rabbit". The song, which she is purported to have written in an hour, is a reflection on the hallucinatory effects of psychedelic drugs; when performed live, it featured a speedier tempo and was an instant favorite among the band's followers. 

Although Slick was an equal contributor to the Great Society's original material, Darby Slick pushed the band toward becoming a raga-influenced psychedelic act. By late 1965, they had become a popular attraction in the Bay Area. Between October and December 1965, the Great Society entered Golden State Recorders and recorded several tracks under the supervision of Sylvester Stewart (better known as Sly Stone). One single emerged from the demos, the Darby Slick-penned "Somebody to Love" (the “B” side to "Free Advice") on the locally based Autumn Records subsidiary label "North Beach". Grace Slick supplied vocals, guitar, piano, and recorder.

1966–1972: Jefferson Airplane
During the autumn of 1966, Jefferson Airplane's then singer Signe Toly Anderson decided to leave the band to raise her child, and Jack Casady asked Slick to join them. Slick stated that she joined the Airplane because it was run in a professional manner, unlike the Great Society. With Slick on board, Jefferson Airplane began recording new music, and they turned in a more psychedelic direction from their former folk-rock style. Surrealistic Pillow included new recordings of "White Rabbit" and "Somebody to Love", both of which became top 10 singles. Jefferson Airplane became one of the most popular bands in the country and earned a position for Slick as one of the most prominent female rock musicians of her time. In 1968, Slick performed "Crown of Creation" on The Smothers Brothers Comedy Hour in blackface and ended the performance with a Black Panther raised fist. In an appearance on a 1969 episode of The Dick Cavett Show, she became the first person to say "motherfucker" on television during a performance of "We Can Be Together".

1970–1984: Jefferson Starship and solo career

After Jack Casady and Jorma Kaukonen decided to leave Jefferson Airplane to focus on their project Hot Tuna, Slick formed Jefferson Starship with Paul Kantner and other bandmates, and also began a string of solo albums with Manhole, followed by Dreams, Welcome to the Wrecking Ball!, and Software. Manhole also featured keyboardist/bassist Pete Sears, who later joined Jefferson Starship in 1974. Sears and Slick penned several early Jefferson Starship songs together, including "Hyperdrive" and "Play On Love". Dreams, which was produced by Ron Frangipane and incorporated many of the ideas she encountered attending twelve-step program meetings, is the most personal of her solo albums and was nominated for a Grammy Award. The song "Do It the Hard Way" from Dreams is one example of Slick's music at the time.

Slick was nicknamed "The Chrome Nun" by David Crosby, who also used the nickname "Baron von Tollbooth" for Kantner. Their nicknames appear as the title of an album she made in 1973 with bandmates Kantner and David Freiberg: Baron von Tollbooth & the Chrome Nun.

1984–1989: Starship and Jefferson Airplane reunion
During the 1980s, while Slick was the only member remaining from Jefferson Airplane in Starship, the band went on to score three chart-topping successes with "We Built This City", "Sara", and "Nothing's Gonna Stop Us Now". Despite the success, Slick since has spoken negatively about the experience and the music. In 1987, Slick co-hosted The Legendary Ladies of Rock & Roll, for which she also sang backing vocals on "Be My Baby" and "Da Doo Ron Ron". She left Starship in 1988, shortly after the release of No Protection.

In 1989, Slick and her former Jefferson Airplane band members reformed the group. They released a self-titled reunion album, and held a successful tour before disbanding.

1989–present: Retirement
Following the Jefferson Airplane reunion, Slick retired from the music business. During a 1998 interview with VH1 on a Behind the Music documentary featuring Jefferson Airplane, Slick, who was never shy about the idea of getting old, said that the main reason she retired from the music business was, "All rock-and-rollers over the age of 50 look stupid and should retire." In a 2007 interview, she repeated her belief that, "You can do jazz, classical, blues, opera, country until you're 150, but rap and rock and roll are really a way for young people to get that anger out", and, "It's silly to perform a song that has no relevance to the present or expresses feelings you no longer have."

Despite her retirement, Slick has appeared twice with Kantner's revamped version of Jefferson Starship; the first came in 1995 when the band played at Los Angeles's House of Blues, as documented on the live album Deep Space/Virgin Sky. The second was for a post-9/11 gig in late 2001, during which she came on the stage initially covered in black from head to toe in a makeshift burqa. She then removed the burqa to reveal a covering bearing an American flag and the words "Fuck Fear". Her statement to fans on the outfit was: "The outfit is not about Islam, it's about oppression; this flag is not about politics, it's about liberty."

After retiring from music, Slick began painting and drawing. She has done many renditions of her fellow 1960s musicians, such as Janis Joplin, Jerry Garcia, and others. Slick has had a passion for art since she was a child, before she pivoted to music. In 2000, she began displaying and selling her artwork. She attends many of her art shows across the United States. She has generally refrained from engaging in the music business, although she did perform on "Knock Me Out", a track from In Flight, the 1996 solo debut from former 4 Non Blondes singer, and friend of daughter China, Linda Perry. The song was also on the soundtrack to the film The Crow: City of Angels.

Slick published her autobiography, Somebody to Love? A Rock and Roll Memoir, in 1998 and narrated an abridged version of the book as an audiobook. A biography, Grace Slick, The Biography, by Barbara Rowes, was released in 1980 and is currently out of print. In a 2001 USA Today article, Slick said, "I'm in good health and people want to know what I do to be this way ... I don't eat cheese, I don't eat duck—the point is I'm vegan." However, she admitted she's "not strict vegan, because I'm a hedonist pig. If I see a big chocolate cake that is made with eggs, I'll have it."

In 2006, Slick suffered from diverticulitis. After initial surgery, she had a relapse requiring further surgery and a tracheotomy. She was placed in an induced coma for two months and then had to learn to walk again. Also in 2006, Slick gave a speech at the inauguration of the new Virgin America airline, which named their first aircraft Jefferson Airplane. In 2010, Slick co-wrote "Edge of Madness" with singer Michelle Mangione to raise money for remediation efforts following the BP oil spill. Grace also sang background vocals on the song and is clearly audible in the middle of the song singing, "On the edge of madness." In recent years, Slick has made sporadic appearances and has done radio interviews. She accepted Jefferson Airplane’s Grammy Lifetime Achievement awards in 2016, and made an appearance for the unveiling of the band’s star on the Hollywood Walk of Fame in 2022.

Personal life
Slick was married to cinematographer and drummer Gerald "Jerry" Slick from 1961 to 1971, then to lighting designer Skip Johnson from 1976 to 1994. She has a daughter, actress China Wing Kantner, born January 25, 1971. China's father is Jefferson Airplane guitarist Paul Kantner, with whom Slick had a relationship from 1969 to 1975.

In 1971, Slick was severely injured when the car she was driving crashed into the inside of a tunnel in San Francisco. This happened while she was drag racing Jorma Kaukonen and both were driving over 100 miles per hour.

Slick has publicly acknowledged her alcoholism and use of substances including LSD and marijuana. She has discussed this, and her rehabilitation experiences, in her autobiography, various interviews, and several published celebrity addiction and recovery books. The latter include The Courage to Change by Dennis Wholey and The Harder They Fall by Gary Stromberg and Jane Merrill. Her alcoholism became a problem for the band during Jefferson Starship's 1978 European tour. The group had to cancel the first night in Germany because she was too intoxicated to perform, causing the audience to riot. She performed the next night with the band but was so inebriated that she could not sing properly. She also attacked the audience, mocking Germany for losing World War II and groping both female audience members and bandmates. She left the group the next day, and she was "dragged off" a San Francisco game show for abusing the contestants. She was admitted to a detoxification facility at least twice, once during the 1970s at Duffy's in Napa Valley, and once in the 1990s with daughter China.

Legal incidents
President Richard Nixon's daughter Tricia and Slick are both alumnae of Finch College, and Slick was invited to a tea party for the alumnae at the White House in 1969. She invited anarchist Abbie Hoffman to be her escort and planned to spike President Nixon's tea with 600 micrograms of LSD, but the party had been billed as an "all ladies" event. Hoffman's presence in the waiting line immediately aroused the suspicions of White House security personnel; he claimed to be Slick's "bodyguard and escort", which failed to convince the security personnel, who told him that the event was "strictly for females". Hoffman then took out a black flag with a multicolored marijuana leaf and hung it on the White House gate. Slick declined to attend once Hoffman was denied entry, and the two ran across the street to a waiting car. Slick later speculated that she received the invitation only because it was addressed to "Grace Wing" (her maiden name), and that she never would have been invited if the Nixons had known that she was Grace Slick.

Slick was arrested at least four times for what she has referred to as "TUI" ("talking under the influence") and "drunk mouth". One incident occurred when a police officer encountered her sitting against a tree trunk in the backwoods of Marin County, California, drinking wine, eating bread, and reading poetry. The officer asked what she was doing; she gave a sarcastic response and was arrested and jailed. She was arrested in 1994 for assault with a deadly weapon after pointing an unloaded gun at a police officer. She alleged that the officer had come onto her property without explanation.

Visual art

After retiring, and after a house fire, divorce, and breakup, Slick began drawing and painting animals, mainly to amuse herself and because doing so made her happy during a difficult period in her life. Soon thereafter, she was approached about writing her memoir, which ultimately became Somebody to Love? A Rock-and-Roll Memoir. Her agent saw her artwork and asked her to do some portraits of some of her various contemporaries from the rock-and-roll genre to be included in the autobiography. Hesitant at first (because she thought "it was way too cute. Rock-n-Roll draws Rock-n-Roll"), she eventually agreed because she found she enjoyed it, and color renditions of Janis Joplin, Jimi Hendrix, and Jerry Garcia appeared in the completed autobiography. An Alice in Wonderland-themed painting and various other sketches are scattered throughout the book. Her paintings of Jorma Kaukonen and Jack Casady were used for the cover art of the 1998 album The Best of Hot Tuna. Though Slick has been drawing and painting since she was a child, she admits to not being able to multitask, so did not do much of it while she was focusing on her music career. A notable exception is the 1974 cover art of her first solo album, Manhole, which she signed "Child Type Odd Art by Grace".

Slick does not always use the same style or medium in her production of visual art and has no interest in doing so. She uses acrylic paints (saying oil paint takes too long to dry), canvas, pen, ink, scratchboard, pastels, and pencil. Many of her works are mixed media. Her styles include the children's bookish Alice in Wonderland themes, realistic rock and roll portraits, scratchboards of animals, minimalist ink wash-styled nudes and a variety of other subjects and styles.

The best-selling prints and originals are her various renditions of the White Rabbit and the portraits of her colleagues in the music industry. In 2006, the popularity of her Alice in Wonderland works led to a partnership with Dark Horse Comics, Inc. that resulted in the release of stationery and journals with the Wonderland motif.

While critics have variously panned and praised her work, Slick seems indifferent to the criticism. She views her visual artistry as just another extension of the artistic temperament that landed her in the music business in the first place, as it allows her to continue to produce art in a way that does not require the physical demands of appearing on a stage nightly or traveling with a large group of people.

Interviewed in 2007, Slick attends many of her art gallery shows across the United States, sometimes attending more than 30 shows in a year. While she says she enjoys talking with the people who come to her art shows, she is not a fan of the traveling involved, particularly the flying.

Legacy
Slick, famous as a rock 'n' roll singer, was one of the earliest female rock stars alongside her close contemporary Janis Joplin, and was an important figure in the development of rock music in the late 1960s. Her distinctive vocal style and striking stage presence exerted influence on other female performers, including Stevie Nicks, Patti Smith, and Terri Nunn (of "Berlin" fame).

Between 1985 and 1999, Slick was the oldest female vocalist on a Billboard Hot 100 chart-topping single. "We Built This City" reached number one on November 16, 1985, shortly after her 46th birthday. Previously, the distinction of the oldest female vocalist with a chart-topping single was Tina Turner, who at age 44 had 1984's number-one smash, "What's Love Got To Do With It". Turner (who is one month younger than Slick) turned 45 two months after the song topped the charts. Slick broke her own record in April 1987 at age 47 when "Nothing's Gonna Stop Us Now" topped the US charts. Her record stood for 12 years but was ultimately broken by Cher, who was 53 in 1999 when "Believe" hit number one.

Slick did vocals for a piece known as "Jazz Numbers", a series of animated shorts about the numbers two through 10 (a number-one short was never made), which aired on Sesame Street. The segment for the number two appeared in the first episode of the first season of Sesame Street, November 10, 1969. She was nominated for a Grammy Award in 1981 as Best Rock Female Vocalist for her solo album Dreams. She also performed the song "Panda" at the 1990 March for the Animals.

She was inducted into the Rock and Roll Hall of Fame in 1996 as a member of Jefferson Airplane.

In 1993, she narrated the Stephen King short story "You Know They Got a Hell of a Band" on his Nightmares & Dreamscapes audiobook.

She was ranked number 20 on VH1's 100 Greatest Women of Rock N Roll in 1999.

In 2017, Grace Slick licensed the Starship song "Nothing's Gonna Stop Us Now" to Chick-fil-A to use in a TV commercial, but because she disagrees with Chick-fil-A's corporate views on same-sex marriage she gave all of the proceeds of that deal to Lambda Legal, an organization that works to advance the civil rights of LGBTQ people and everyone living with HIV.

Discography

Solo albums

Collaborative albums

Other appearances

References

External links

Jefferson Airplane official website

Episode of Biography about Grace Slick
Area Arts, Grace Slick's US art distributor
Counterculture Meets Mall Culture for Grace Slick

 

1939 births
20th-century American women singers
American contraltos
American women singer-songwriters
20th-century American painters
American people of English descent
American people of Norwegian descent
American people of Scottish descent
American people of Swedish descent
American women rock singers
American rock songwriters
Artists from Evanston, Illinois
Castilleja School alumni
Finch College alumni
Jefferson Airplane members
Jefferson Starship members
Living people
Musicians from Evanston, Illinois
Musicians from the San Francisco Bay Area
Palo Alto High School alumni
Psychedelic rock musicians
University of Miami alumni
Writers from Evanston, Illinois
20th-century American singers
21st-century American painters
Singer-songwriters from California
Singer-songwriters from Illinois